Eagle River Airport  was located  southeast of Eagle River, Ontario, Canada.

References

External links
Page about this airport on COPA's Places to Fly airport directory

Defunct airports in Ontario
Registered aerodromes in Kenora District